Dempster may refer to:

 Dempster (surname), a surname
 Dempster Woodworth, Wisconsin state senator and physician
 Dempster (deemster) – an official at pre-1746 baronial courts' moot hills in Scotland.
 Dempster, South Dakota
 Dempster Land District, Western Australia
 Dempster Highway, a Canadian roadway, in the Yukon and Northwest Territories
 Dempster Street, a major east–west artery north of Chicago, Illinois, part of which is part of U.S. Route 14
 Dempster (CTA Purple Line station), a Chicago Transit Authority rapid transit station in Evanston, Illinois
 Dempster-Skokie (CTA station), a Chicago Transit Authority rapid transit station in Skokie, Illinois
 Dempster Street station (C&NW), a former commuter rail station in Evanston, Illinois
 Dempster Brothers, Inc., a Tennessee industrial firm
 Dempster Dumpmaster, a garbage-handling vehicle manufactured by the company
 Dempster Dumpster, a waste receptacle manufactured by the company
 Dempster's brand bread, a product of Canada Bread
 Dempsters, a manufacturing company in Nebraska.